Gordon Johnstone (9 February 1885 – 9 November 1961) was an Australian cricketer. He played three first-class cricket matches for Victoria between 1910 and 1913.

See also
 List of Victoria first-class cricketers

References

External links
 

1885 births
1961 deaths
Australian cricketers
Victoria cricketers
Cricketers from Melbourne